Žilina railway station serves the city and municipality of Žilina, seat of the Žilina Region, northern Slovakia. Opened in 1871, the station is an important railway junction between the Bratislava–Žilina railway and the Košice–Žilina railway, both of which form part of Slovakia's main east–west rail corridor. It is also a junction for two other lines.

The station is currently owned by Železnice Slovenskej republiky (ŽSR); train services are operated by Železničná spoločnosť Slovensko (ZSSK).

Location
Žilina railway station is situated in Pavla Orságha Hviezdoslava, at the northeastern edge of the city centre.

History
The station was opened on 8 January 1871, upon the inauguration of the Český Těšín–Žilina section of the Košice–Bohumín Railway.

Facilities
The station building is decorated with stained glass windows. It houses information and ticketing facilities, and a restaurant.

Lines
Žilina railway station is the junction of the following Slovakian railway lines:

120 Bratislava–Žilina
126 Žilina–Rajec
127 Žilina–Čadca–Svrčinovec zastávka–Mosty u Jablunkova (ČD) (part of the Košice–Bohumín Railway)
180 Košice–Žilina (also part of the Košice–Bohumín Railway)

Lines 120 and 180 are both part of Pan-European Corridor Va, which runs from Venice in Italy to Kyiv in Ukraine, via Bratislava, Žilina, Košice and Uzhhorod.

Services

Interchange
The station offers interchange with local buses.

See also

History of rail transport in Slovakia
Rail transport in Slovakia

References

External links

 Žilina railway station on vlaky.net 

Railway Station
Railway stations in Žilina Region
Railway stations opened in 1871
Buildings and structures in Žilina Region
Railway stations in Slovakia opened in the 19th century